Matthew Nowicki (in Poland known as Maciej Nowicki) (26 June 1910 – 1 September 1950) was a Polish architect. He was chief architect of the new Indian city of Chandigarh.

Career
Nowicki was born in Chita in Siberia.  After the Second World War he received a commission to work on plans for the reconstruction of Poland's capital city, Warsaw. In December 1945 he was posted to New York City as an official delegate of the Polish state, to advertise the rebuilding of Poland.

Nowicki was the architect of the J.S. Dorton Arena in Raleigh built in 1952 after his death. He was a member of the 'Workshop of Peace' team working on the United Nations Headquarters. He was a chair of the Faculty of Architecture at North Carolina State University.

His wife, Stanislawa Nowicki, was also an architect who taught from 1951 to 1977 at the University of Pennsylvania.

Death
Nowicki died around midnight on 31 August/1 September 1950, in the crash of Trans World Airlines Flight 903 near Wadi Natrun in the Western Desert of Egypt. He had been returning from India where he was chief architect designing the new city of Chandigarh.

References

Further reading

External links

"Maciej Nowicki: A Tribute to a Neglected Genius"
J.S. Dorton Arena 
Gasthouse "Hetman", designed by Maciej Nowicki, Stanisława Nowicka and W. Stokowski
 Library of Congress
 Guide to the Matthew Nowicki Drawings and Other Material 1944-2011
Web Poster Exhibition - Polish Art Deco posters in Lviv
Nowicki 100th anniversary conference
Maciej Nowicki; humanista, wizjoner i architekt, p. 70-74

1910 births
1950 deaths
Victims of aviation accidents or incidents in Egypt
20th-century Polish architects
North Carolina State University faculty
Victims of aviation accidents or incidents in 1950